Mark Roberts (born 9 November 1982) is a former Wales international rugby league footballer who played in the 2000s and 2010s.

Playing career

Club career
Mark Roberts made his début for the Wigan Warriors in 2003's Super League VIII as an interchange/substitute in the 24–22 victory over St. Helens at the JJB Stadium, Wigan on Friday 18 April 2003, and he played his last match for the Wigan Warriors as an interchange/substitute in the 22–18 victory over the Widnes Vikings at Halton Stadium, Widnes, on Saturday 10 May 2003.

International
Mark's one cap for Wales was in the 26–50 defeat to Lebanon on 9 Nov 2007 in Widnes; he was #15 on the interchange/substitute bench.

References

1982 births
Living people
Blackpool Panthers players
English people of Welsh descent
English rugby league players
Halifax R.L.F.C. players
Leigh Leopards players
Oldham R.L.F.C. players
Place of birth missing (living people)
Rugby articles needing expert attention
Rugby league centres
Rugby league second-rows
Wales national rugby league team players
Wigan Warriors players